Sylvie Testud (born 17 January 1971) is a French actress whose film career began in 1991. She won the César Award for Most Promising Actress for Murderous Maids (2000), the César Award for Best Actress for Fear and Trembling (2003), and the European Film Award for Best Actress for Lourdes (2009). Her other film roles include Beyond Silence (1996), La Vie en Rose (2007), and French Women (2014).

Life and career
She grew up in the La Croix-Rousse quarter of Lyon, France. This was an area with many Portuguese, Spanish and Italian immigrants. Her mother immigrated from Italy in the 1960s. Her French father left the family when Sylvie was just two years old.

In 1985, when she was 14, she saw Charlotte Gainsbourg in her role of the complex young girl in L'Effrontée, a film directed by Claude Miller, identified with Gainsbourg, and so took drama classes in Lyon with the actor and director Christian Taponard. In 1989, she moved to Paris and spent three years at the Conservatoire (CNSAD). In the early and mid 1990s, she landed her first small roles in films like L'Histoire du garçon qui voulait qu'on l'embrasse, directed by Philippe Harel, and Love, etc., directed by Marion Vernoux. In 1997 she had great success in Germany with Caroline Link's Jenseits der Stille for which she learned German, sign language, and the clarinet. In 1998 she had her first major role in French cinema playing Béa in Thomas Vincent's Karnaval. In 2000 she starred in Chantal Akerman's La Captive, an adaptation of La Prisonière, the fifth part of Marcel Proust's À la recherche du temps perdu. In 2001 she won the César Award for Most Promising Actress for her portrayal of Christine Papin, one of the Papin sisters, in Les Blessures assassines (English title: Murderous Maids). The story concerned a young servant woman found guilty of the murder, with her sister's help, of her employer's wife and daughter; it had made sensational headlines in France in 1933.

In 2003, she published the autobiographical book Il n'y a pas beaucoup d'étoiles ce soir, with anecdotes of her day-to-day life as an actress. The French edition featured a cover designed by her sister Ghislaine.

One of her most noted performances was as the star of the film Stupeur et tremblements, adapted from the novel by Amélie Nothomb, for which she was awarded a César and a Lumières Award for Best Actress in 2004. She plays a woman struggling with the difference in culture between the Japanese business world and the western, Belgian world, from which she comes. In 2005 or 2006 she returned to her native Lyon (to the Théâtre de la Croix Rousse), where she played the rôle of Edith in Philippe Faure's adaptation of Stefan Zweig's La Pitié dangereuse. She starred in 2007's two-time Academy Award-winning film La Vie en rose, as Momone, Edith Piaf's best friend. In the 2008 film Sagan, she portrayed the writer Françoise Sagan, earning unanimous praise for her hauntingly accurate portrayal and for which she was again nominated for the César for best actress.

She was made Chevalier (Knight) of the Ordre national du Mérite in March 2009.

She has a son, Ruben, born on 15 February 2005, and a daughter Esther, born in January 2011.

In 2012, she participated in Rendez-vous en terre inconnue.

Filmography

Feature films

Television

Director

Decorations 
 Officer of the Order of Arts and Letters (2016)

Awards and nominations

Deutscher Filmpreis

César Awards

Lumières Award

Globes de Cristal Awards

European Film Awards

References

External links

Sylvie Testud at Actricesdefrance.org
CSOJ – Alain Badiou Sylvie Testud appears on French television's program Ce Soir (En direct, channel 3) in conversation with militant philosopher Alain Badiou. The topic of this episode is "Faut-il réinventer l'amour?". Ms. Testud appears 46:18 minutes into the program and is in conversation with Badiou and the program host for about 24 minutes (no commercials, this show is in French).

1971 births
Living people
French film actresses
French people of Italian descent
Knights of the Ordre national du Mérite
Best Actress César Award winners
Actresses from Lyon
Best Actress German Film Award winners
European Film Award for Best Actress winners
Best Actress Lumières Award winners
20th-century French actresses
21st-century French actresses
French film directors
French women film directors
Most Promising Actress César Award winners
French National Academy of Dramatic Arts alumni
Cours Florent alumni
French women screenwriters
French screenwriters
Officiers of the Ordre des Arts et des Lettres